McNealy is a surname. Notable people with the surname include:

Chris McNealy (born 1961), American basketball player
Maverick McNealy (born 1995), American golfer
Rusty McNealy (born 1958), American baseball player
Scott McNealy (born 1954), American businessman